Paul G. Zerling (7 April 1890 – 16 May 1972) was a Swedish sprint runner who competed at the 1912 Summer Olympics. He was eliminated in the semi-finals of the 400 m competition. He was also a member of the Swedish relay team which was eliminated in the first round of the 4 × 400 m relay event.

References

External links

Profile

1890 births
1972 deaths
Swedish male sprinters
Olympic athletes of Sweden
Athletes (track and field) at the 1912 Summer Olympics
20th-century Swedish people